Newman (full name and dates of birth and death unknown) was an English cricketer. 

Newman made a single first-class appearance for Petworth against the Marylebone Cricket Club in 1845 at Lord's. Petworth were dismissed for 88 in their first-innings, with Newman being dismissed for a duck by William Lillywhite. The Marylebone Cricket Club responded to this by making 89 in their first-innings, while Petworth made 69 in their second-innings, during which Newman was dismissed for 2 runs by William Hillyer. The Marylebone Cricket Club reached 70/6 in their second-innings to win the match by 4 wickets. This was his only major appearance.

References

External links
Newman at ESPNcricinfo
Newman at CricketArchive

English cricketers
Petworth cricketers